Evans Kangwa (born 9 October 1992) is a Zambian international footballer who plays for Chinese Super League club Qingdao Hainiu as a left winger.

Career

Club career
Born in Kasama, Kangwa has played club football in Zambia for Nkana. He scored two league goals during the 2010 season, and one league goal during the 2011 season. In December 2012, it was announced that Kangwa would join English club Watford on trial in January 2013.

On 3 July 2014 he was loaned to Israeli club Hapoel Ra'anana He made his league debut for the club on 13 September 2014 in a 4-0 home victory over Hapoel Petah Tikva. He was replaced by Mamadou Touré Thiam in the 60th minute. He scored his first league goal for the club on 25 October 2014 in a 2-0 away win against Maccabi Haifa. His goal, the first of the match, came in the 13th minute.

On 1 August 2016, Kangwa transferred to Turkish Süper Lig club Gaziantepspor on a free transfer. His league debut came on 21 August 2016 in a 2-0 away defeat to Gençlerbirliği. He was replaced by Alpay Koçaklı in the 58th minute. His first league goal for the club came as a brace against Bursaspor on 1 October 2016. The match ended 3-2 in favor of Gaziantepspor. Kangwa started the game off with an assist on Nabil Ghilas's 31st-minute goal. He scored his first of the game in the 60th minute, with an assist from Bart van Hintum. He rounded the day off with a 79th-minute goal, assisted by substitute Daniel Larsson, that sealed the victory for his side that day.

On 26 August 2017, he moved to the Russian Premier League, signing with FC Arsenal Tula. He made his league debut for the club on 29 September 2017 in a 1-0 home victory over FC Krasnodar. He scored his first goal in the Russian Premier League on 15 October 2017 in a 1-0 away win against Zenit. His goal, assisted by Kirill Kombarov, came in the 73rd minute.

On 19 June 2021, he extended his contract with Arsenal Tula for two more seasons. Kangwa left Arsenal on 28 January 2023.

In February 2023, he joined Chinese Super League club Qingdao Hainiu.

International career
Kangwa played for the Zambian under-20 side, winning the COSAFA U-20 Challenge Cup in 2011.

Kangwa made his senior debut for Zambia in 2011, and was selected for the final 23-man squad at the 2012 Africa Cup of Nations.
Kangwa did not appear at the tournament, with manager Hervé Renard stating he did not want to rush the youngster.

In December 2014 he was named as part of Zambia's preliminary squad for the 2015 Africa Cup of Nations.

Personal life
Kangwa's younger brother, Kings, also represents the Zambian national team.

Career statistics

Club

International

International goals
Scores and results list Zambia's goal tally first.

Honours
Nkana
Zambian Premier League: 2013

Zambia
Africa Cup of Nations: 2012

References

External links

1992 births
People from Kasama District
Living people
Zambian footballers
Zambia international footballers
Association football wingers
Nkana F.C. players
Hapoel Ra'anana A.F.C. players
FC Arsenal Tula players
Qingdao Hainiu F.C. (1990) players
Zambia Super League players
Israeli Premier League players
Russian Premier League players
Russian First League players
Chinese Super League players
2012 Africa Cup of Nations players
2015 Africa Cup of Nations players
Africa Cup of Nations-winning players
Zambian expatriate footballers
Zambian expatriate sportspeople in Israel
Expatriate footballers in Israel
Zambian expatriate sportspeople in Russia
Expatriate footballers in Russia
Zambian expatriate sportspeople in China
Expatriate footballers in China